Justin Gulley (born 15 January 1993) is a New Zealand professional footballer who currently plays as a defender for Team Wellington.

Club career

Wellington Phoenix
On 4 October 2015, Gulley signed a senior contract with Wellington Phoenix.

Wellington United
On 10 May 2016, Wellington Phoenix released Gulley from his contract so he could gain gametime at Wellington United.

Team Wellington
After missing out on a new contract with Wellington Phoenix, Gulley signed again with Team Wellington.

In September 2019, Gulley rejoin to Team Wellington.

International career

U-20
Gulley played every game for the New Zealand national under-20 football team at the 2013 OFC U-20 Championship which they won, meaning they qualified to play at the 2013 FIFA U-20 World Cup in Turkey.

Gulley made his World Cup debut in New Zealand in a 0–3 loss to Uzbekistan, coming on as a sub in the 69th minute. He got his first start in the next match again Uruguay before again coming off the bench in their last game against Croatia.

National team
On the 19 March 2018, Gulley was called up for the New Zealand national football team for their friendly against Canada after initially being placed on the standby list, after Storm Roux withdrew from the team due to personal reasons.

Honours

Club
 New Zealand Football Championship: Premiers 2011–12, 2016–17; Runner Up 2011–12, 2013–14, 2017–18
 OFC Champions League Runner Up: 2014–2015, 2017

International
 OFC U-20 Championship: 2013

References

External links
 

Living people
1993 births
Association football defenders
New Zealand association footballers
New Zealand international footballers
Wellington Phoenix FC players
Wellington United players
Team Wellington players
A-League Men players
New Zealand Football Championship players